Songwe Hydroelectric Power Station, also Songwe Power Station, is a proposed hydropower plant, with planned capacity installation of  when completed. Other related developments include the development of more dams for both power generation and irrigation purposes, and the creation of a Joint River Basin Authority.

Location
The power station would be located on the Songwe River, straddling the common border between Tanzania and Malawi.

Overview
This power station is the first to be developed by the Joint Songwe River Basin Commission, co-owned by the Government of Tanzania and the Government of Malawi. The power station design calls for the creation of a reservoir, to be used for power generation and irrigation purposes in both countries.

As of May 2017, the feasibility studies and environmental and social impact assessment (ESIA) had been completed. The final design had been agreed upon. Commitment of funding from potential investors was being sought.

Construction
The African Development Bank (AfDB) funded the feasibility and design studies. The final design report was expected at the end of 2015. Other administrative and funding matters were expected to conclude in 2016. Construction was expected to start after that and conclude in 2022. Each country will be allocated  from this project.

The total cost of the project is quoted at US$829 million, to  be shared equally by the two countries. The AfDB has expressed willingness to fund this project.

See also

List of power stations in Tanzania
List of power stations in Malawi
List of hydropower stations in Africa
List of hydroelectric power stations

References

External links
 Songwe Power Project to Benefit Five Districts in Tanzania
 World Bank Announces US$1 Billion Pledge to Africa’s Great Lakes Region

Hydroelectric power stations in Tanzania
Mbeya Region
Hydroelectric power stations in Malawi
Chitipa District
Proposed hydroelectric power stations
Proposed renewable energy power stations in Tanzania
Proposed renewable energy power stations in Malawi